Asalam Dasht (also Romanized as Asālam Dasht) is a village in Sakht Sar Rural District, in the Central District of Ramsar County, Mazandaran Province, Iran. At the 2006 census, its population was 24, in 6 families.

References 

Populated places in Ramsar County